Combermere School is a school in Barbados, notable as one of the oldest schools in the Caribbean, established in 1695. Its alumni include several leading cricketers, David Thompson, sixth prime minister of Barbados and other politicians, several authors and the singer Rihanna. In its first 75 years, the school "provided the Barbadian community with the vast bulk of its business leaders and civil servants " and it is "perhaps the first school anywhere to offer secondary education to black children".

History 
The school was initially established in 1695 as the Drax Parish School, under the 1682 will of plantation owner Colonel Henry Drax (great-uncle of the Whig politician Henry Drax), who had left 200 pounds sterling for the establishment and endowment of a "free school or Colledge" "to continue forever". The executors not having acted in a timely manner, the parish authorities eventually did. The oldest secondary school on Barbados and one of the oldest schools in the Caribbean, it underwent several name changes and relocations before settling, withn the Parish of St Michael, at Waterford on the outskirts of the capital of Barbados, Bridgetown, in 1819.

The school, named after a colonial governor of Barbados, Stapleton Cotton, 1st Viscount Combermere, bears tribute to some of the school forefathers through the naming of areas such as the Drax Square, the De Vere Moore Gardens, and the Major Noot Hall.  It was the first school to offer secondary education to poorer coloured students on the island. Having started as a co-educational institution, it returned to a mixed approach in the 1970s, eventually reaching a gender ratio of around 50%.

In 1995, Barbados issued a set of postage stamps commemorating the school's 300 years.

In 2016, the school was closed due to environmental concerns. The remediation efforts were slowed by alleged sabotage, but the school eventually reopened in 2017.

Staff and structure  
Combermere is led by a principal, assisted by a deputy principal; there are also six year heads for first form through to the upper sixth.  There are over 70 staff in total, including a guidance counsellor.

Departments and subjects 
The school has 12 departments, each headed by a senior teacher. The departments are: chemistry, mathematics, geography/social studies and environmental science, physics, biology and home economics, English, music and fine arts, physical education, technical and vocational studies, history, foreign languages, and business studies. There are dedicated labs and rooms for chemistry, biology, geography, physics, languages, music, computer science, and food and nutrition. The school has a pavilion equipped with a gym and changing rooms. There are two playing fields, a cricket pitch, shooting range, basketball/netball and tennis/volleyball courts. Also included on the premises are a library and an auditorium — the Major Noot Hall — and it one of the few secondary schools on Barbados, if not the only one, with a meteorological station.

Combermere offers a music programme. It is also home to the Number 3 Cadet Company.

Notable alumni

 Carlos Brathwaite – current West Indian cricketer, unrelated to Kraigg
 Kraigg Brathwaite – current West Indian cricketer, unrelated to Carlos
 Ron Buckmire – mathematician and LGBT activist
 Austin Clarke – Commonwealth award-winning author
 Frank Collymore – author, editor, and artist
 Sir Wesley Winfield Hall – former Barbadian, West Indian cricketer, Chairman of the West Indies Board of Control, Minister for Sports and Tourism
 Kerryann Ifill – first blind graduate of the University of the West Indies, President of the Senate of Barbados since 2012
 Chris Jordan - current English cricketer
 Anthony Kellman – poet, novelist and musician
 George Lamming – author and public intellectual
 Frank Marshall – former Anglican Dean of Barbados, based at the Cathedral Church of Saint Michael and All Angels
 Rihanna (Robyn Rihanna Fenty) – recording artist
 Keith A. P. Sandiford – social historian
 Owen Alik Shahadah – African historian, filmmaker - 500 Years Later
 Charles Skeete – economist and former Ambassador to the United States (1981–1983)
 Arturo Tappin – saxophonist
 The Hon. David J. H Thompson – sixth Prime Minister of Barbados
 Sir Clyde Walcott, KA, GCM – former West Indies cricketer, former Chairman of the International Cricket Council
 Arden Warner, particle physicist, inventor and Barbadian Golden Jubilee awardee 
 Jomel Warrican – current West Indian cricketer
 Sir Frank Worrell – former West Indies batsman and captain
 Right Excellent Errol Barrow, PC, QC, LLD -First Prime Minister of Barbados

See also
Lord Combermere
List of schools in Barbados
Education in Barbados

References

External links
Official website

Schools in Barbados
 
Saint Michael, Barbados